Nora Ney (as Sonia Najman or Zofia Neuman) (25 May 1906 in Sielachowskie, near Białystok - 21 February 2003 in Encinitas, USA) was a Polish film actress of Jewish descent.

She fled Poland to the USSR, after the German occupation, to accept an invitation from Mosfilm, but was soon deported to Kazakhstan

In 1946 she moved to the USA, with her daughter Joanna. Due to her language problems, in America she managed to secure only minor non-speaking roles in films.

Nora Ney was married four times, her first husband was the cinematographer Seweryn Steinwurzel.

Selected filmography
 The Woman Who Desires Sin (Kobieta, która grzechu pragnie, 1929)
 Policmajster Tagiejew (1929)
 Serce na ulicy (1931)
 Sound of the Desert (Głos pustyni, 1932)
 Córka generała Pankratowa (1934)
 Kobiety nad przepaścią (1938)
 Doctor Murek (Doktór Murek, 1939)

References

External links
 

1906 births
2003 deaths
Polish film actresses
Polish silent film actresses
Polish emigrants to the United States
20th-century Polish actresses
American people of Polish-Jewish descent
People from Białystok County
People from Belostoksky Uyezd
Jews from the Russian Empire